Dəli Quşçu (also, Dəliquşçu) is a village and municipality in the Zardab Rayon of Azerbaijan.  It has a population of 1,245.

References 

Populated places in Zardab District